The women's team recurve archery competition at the 2018 Asian Games was held from 21 to 27 August at Gelora Bung Karno Archery Field.

A total of 14 teams participated in the ranking round to determine the seeds for knockout round.

Schedule
All times are Western Indonesia Time (UTC+07:00)

Results 
Legend
DNS — Did not start

Ranking round

Knockout round

1/8 eliminations

Quarterfinals

Semifinals

Bronze medal match

Gold medal match

References

External links
Official website

Women's team recurve